Agnack Grand is a village in the Ziguinchor Department of Ziguinchor Region in the Basse Casamance area of south Senegal.

In the 2002 census 114 inhabitants were recorded.

References

Populated places in the Ziguinchor Department
Casamance